The IND Monthly (formerly The Independent Weekly) was a newspaper published in Lafayette, Louisiana. It was launched in 2003.

It printed its final issue in March 2017 and shut down permanently in June 2017.

References

External links
 IND Media

Newspapers published in Louisiana
Lafayette Parish, Louisiana
Mass media in Lafayette, Louisiana
2003 establishments in Louisiana